Marlon Javier Licona Lopez (born 9 February 1991) is a Honduran professional footballer who plays as a goalkeeper for the club Motagua.

Career
Licona began his career with Motagua in 2010, and is the long-time backup goalkeeper for the squad. He made his professional debut with Motagua in a 2–1 Liga Nacional loss to Olimpia on 1 September 2013. He briefly joined Honduras Progreso on loan for the 2017-18 season.

International career
Licona was called up to represent Honduras at the 2021 CONCACAF Gold Cup.

References

External links
 

1991 births
Living people
People from Olancho Department
Honduran footballers
F.C. Motagua players
C.D. Honduras Progreso players
Honduras under-20 international footballers
Association football goalkeepers
Liga Nacional de Fútbol Profesional de Honduras players
2021 CONCACAF Gold Cup players